Mount Oxley (Aboriginal: Oombi Oombi) is a hill situated  from Bourke in the Far West region of New South Wales in outback Australia.

It is a small relic of a formerly large sedimentary rock formation, mostly now eroded away. The underlying and surrounding rocks are sedimentary sandstone and metamorphic quartzite.

The first European to visit the mountain was Charles Sturt in December 1828. He mentioned "a report as of a gun discharge" near Mount Oxley. He surmised "it might be some gaseous explosion".

Etymology
Named after the explorer John Oxley, the mountain is known as Oombi Oombi to the Indigenous Australians. Archaeological evidence suggested that they quarried the area for grinding stones. Stones from Mount Oxley were highly regarded and expensive, and reportedly managed by indigenous elders.

Flora and fauna
Plants growing here have adapted to the semi-arid climate. They include species of Acacia, the desert bloodwood, weeping pittosporum and leopardwood. Wildflowers of the daisy family are prominent after rain. Animals seen here include western grey kangaroo and feral goats. Wedge-tailed eagles are often seen flying above the mountain.

Geology
A number of small crater-like rocky formations may be seen in two distinct lines on the top part of the hill. There is ongoing speculation regarding their formation. The most likely explanation for the speculated 'huge steam vents', explosions and craters is geological. Other theories include meteors, evil spirits, omens, artillery, animals or unidentified human activity. Charles Sturt's exploring party reached there in January 1828 and recorded a description of the curious craters:

Mount Oxley has been mooted as a site for a seven-turbine  wind farm.

See also

 List of mountains of New South Wales

References 

Oxley
North West Slopes